Daredevils of the West is an American Western movie serial consisting of 12 chapters, released by Republic Pictures in 1943 starring Allan Lane and Kay Aldridge. 
The plot involves a gang of land-grabbers who try to prevent safe passage of the Foster Stage Company through frontier territory. There are similarities of style with other Republic serials released during wartime, such as King of the Mounties and The Masked Marvel.

Both Native American actors who played the Lone Ranger's companion Tonto, Chief Thunder Cloud (of the 1930s Lone Ranger movie serials) and Jay Silverheels (of 1950s Lone Ranger television program) appear in the sequence in which Kay Aldridge and Eddie Acuff are held hostage by Indians.

The serial was long considered to be a partially lost film; for years, copies of only chapters 2, 4, 5, and 12 circulated on 16-mm among film collectors. The entire serial, however, was never fully "lost", it was simply never re-released to theaters, or released on video because five reels of sound from the archival material apparently went missing not long after the serial's original exhibition. The absence of these reels may be the reason why Republic Pictures had no objection to subsequently selling off an incomplete print of the serial to cowboy actor William "Hopalong Cassidy" Boyd for use as stock footage.

All 12 chapters were screened, for the first time in 65 years, in May 2008 by the Serial Squadron at SerialFest 2008 in Newtown, Bucks County, Pennsylvania. The film was subsequently shown at the Lone Pine film festival in October 2009 and at the Memphis film festival in June 2010.

Daredevils of the West, with restored audio and dubbed missing-dialogue sequences, was  released on DVD by the Serial Squadron, an organization that restores classic film serials, in  February 2011.

Cast
 Allan Lane as Duke Cameron
 Kay Aldridge as June Foster
 Eddie Acuff as Red Kelly
 William Haade as Barton Ward
 Robert Frazer as Martin Dexter
 Ted Adams as Silas Higby
 George J. Lewis as Turner
 Charles F. Miller as Foster

Production
Daredevils of the West was budgeted at $140,550, although the final negative cost was $167,003 (a $26,453, or 18.8%, overspend). It was the cheapest Republic serial of 1943.

It was filmed between 9 January and 13 February 1943.  The serial's production number was 1199.

Kay Aldridge and Allan Lane were billed as "their Majesties, the King and Queen of Serials".

Stunts
 Tom Steele as Duke Cameron (doubling Lane)
 Babe DeFreest as June Foster (doubling Aldridge)
 Pierce Lyden
 Eddie Parker
 Allen Pomeroy
 Ken Terrell
 Bill Yrigoyen
 Joe Yrigoyen

Special effects
All the special effects in Daredevils of the West were produced by the Lydecker brothers.

Release

Theatrical
The movie's official release date was 1 May 1943, although this is actually the date the sixth chapter was made available to film exchanges.

Chapter titles
 Valley of Death (24min 44s)
 Flaming Prison (15min 33s)
 The Killer Strikes (15min 35s)
 Tunnel of Terror (15min 32s)
 Fiery Tomb (15min 32s)
 Redskin Raiders (15min 33s)
 Perilous Pursuit (15min 36s)
 Dance of Doom (15min 31s)
 Terror Trail (15min 32s)
 Suicide Showdown (15min 32s)
 Cavern of Cremation (15min 34s)
 Frontier Justice (15min 32s)
Source:

See also
 List of film serials by year
 List of film serials by studio

References

External links

 
 
 B-Westerns: Allan Lane (small section on Dardevils of the West)

1943 films
1943 Western (genre) films
American Western (genre) films
American black-and-white films
1940s English-language films
Films directed by John English
Republic Pictures film serials
Films with screenplays by Joseph F. Poland
1940s American films